Renee Graziano (born July 12, 1968) is an American reality television personality and author. She is known for being the daughter of Anthony Graziano, a former consigliere of the Bonanno crime family and her roles in two reality television shows, Mob Wives and Celebrity Big Brother. In 2016, Renee came third on Celebrity Big Brother 18.

Family
Graziano lives in Staten Island, New York City. Her former husband, Hector Pagan, Jr., was a mobster who became a DEA informant, and gave evidence against her father, Anthony Graziano. In 2014, Pagan was sentenced to eleven years' imprisonment for murder. They have one son, AJ.

Career
Graziano has appeared as a prominent character in all six seasons of Mob Wives, from 2011 to 2016. The show was conceived and is executive-produced by Graziano's sister, Jenn Graziano. In 2016, she appeared in Celebrity Big Brother 18 where she reached the final and finished in third place with an 14.66% of the vote. She was the last standing woman and American in the house. In January 2017, Graziano and her partner Joey Gambino were featured on the ninth season of Marriage Boot Camp. In December 2022 she starred in the VH1 movie Fuhgeddabout Christmas along side Justina Valentine, Vinny Guadagnino, and Teresa Giudice. 

She has released two books: a semi-autobiographical novel, Playing With Fire, and a cookbook, How to Use a Meat Cleaver: Secrets and Recipes from a Mob Family's Kitchen (2014).

DUI Arrest
Graziano was arrested on charges of operating a motor vehicle while impaired after she crashed her car into a parked car in Staten Island, New York on January 4, 2022. Graziano was driving a 2020 Nissan Murano when she allegedly lost control and collided with an unoccupied 2020 Jeep Wrangler at the intersection of Arden Avenue and Arthur Kill Road.

References

1969 births
Living people
People from Staten Island
American cookbook writers
American women novelists
Bonanno crime family
21st-century American non-fiction writers
21st-century American novelists
21st-century American women writers
American women non-fiction writers
Participants in American reality television series
Big Brother (British TV series) contestants